This is a list of radio stations in the Philippines.

Luzon

Bicol Region

Cagayan Valley Region

Central Luzon

Cordillera Administrative Region

Ilocos Region

Metro Manila

Southern Tagalog

Mindanao

Agusan del Norte

AM stations

FM stations

Camiguin

FM stations

Davao Region

Lanao del Norte

AM stations

FM stations

Maguindanao

AM stations

FM stations

Misamis Occidental

AM stations

FM stations

Misamis Oriental

South Cotabato

AM stations

FM stations

Zamboanga City

AM stations

FM stations

Zamboanga del Norte

AM stations

FM stations

Zamboanga del Sur

AM stations

FM stations

Zamboanga Sibugay

FM stations

Visayas

Antique Province

AM stations

FM stations

Bohol

AM stations

FM stations

Boracay

FM stations

Cebu

Guimaras

FM stations

Iloilo

Kalibo

AM stations

FM stations

Leyte

AM stations

FM stations

Negros Occidental

AM stations

FM stations

Negros Oriental

AM stations

FM stations

Roxas City

AM stations

FM stations

Siquijor

FM stations

Other stations

Internet stations

Satellite-only stations
List of satellite radio stations that are exclusively available on direct-to-home (DTH) satellite:

Shortwave stations

In addition, most international stations (such as China Radio International, Voice of America, BBC World Service, KBS World Radio, NHK World Radio Japan, Radio Thailand World Service, Radio Taiwan International and others) are also heard via shortwave.

See also
Radio in the Philippines
List of television stations in the Philippines

References

 Enriquez, E., and Bernabe, E., and Freeman, B. C. (2012). "Voices of a nation: Radio in the Philippines." in J. Hendrick (Ed.) The Palgrave Handbook of Global Radio, pp. 275–298. UK: Palgrave Macmillan.